Galtara reticulata is a moth of the subfamily Arctiinae. It was described by George Hampson in 1909. It is found in the Democratic Republic of the Congo, Rwanda and Uganda.

References

 

Nyctemerina
Moths described in 1909